This list of chemical elements named after people includes elements named for people both directly and indirectly.  Of the 118 elements, 19 are connected with the names of 20 people.  15 elements were named to honor 16 scientists (as curium honours both Marie and Pierre Curie).  Four others have indirect connection to the names of non-scientists. Only gadolinium and samarium occur in nature; the rest are man-made.

List
These 19 elements are connected to the names of people.  Seaborg and Oganessian were the living persons honored by having elements named after them; Oganessian is the only one still alive. Names were proposed to honor Einstein and Fermi while they were still alive, but they had both died by the time those names became official.

The four elements associated with non-scientists were not named in their honor but named for something else bearing their name: samarium for the mineral samarskite from which it was isolated; and americium, berkelium and livermorium after places named for them.  The cities of Berkeley, California and Livermore, California are the locations of the University of California Radiation Laboratory and Lawrence Livermore National Laboratory, respectively.

Other connections
Other element names connected with people (real or mythological) have been proposed but failed to gain official international recognition.  The following such names received past significant use among scientists:
cassiopeium after the constellation Cassiopeia, hence indirectly connected to the mythological Cassiopeia (now lutetium);
columbium after Christopher Columbus (now niobium);
hahnium after Otto Hahn (now dubnium, also later proposed for what is now hassium);
joliotium after Irène Joliot-Curie (now nobelium, also later proposed for what is now dubnium);
kurchatovium after Igor Kurchatov (now rutherfordium);

Names had also been suggested (but not used) to honour Henri Becquerel (becquerelium) and Paul Langevin (langevinium).

(See the article on element naming controversies and List of chemical elements named after places.)

Also, mythological entities have had a significant impact on the naming of elements.  Helium, titanium, selenium, palladium, promethium, cerium, europium, mercury, thorium, uranium, neptunium and plutonium are all given names connected to mythological characters.  With some, that connection is indirect:
 helium: named for the Sun where it was discovered by spectral analysis, being associated with the deity Helios,
 iridium: named for the Greek goddess Iris,
 tellurium: named for the Roman goddess of the earth, Tellus Mater,
 niobium: named for Niobe, a character of Greek mythology,
 vanadium: named for Vanadis, another name for Norse goddess Freyja,
 selenium: named for the Moon being associated with the deity Selene,
 palladium: named for the then-recently discovered asteroid Pallas which had been named for the deity Pallas Athena,
 cerium: named for the then-recently discovered asteroid Ceres which had been named for the deity Ceres,
 europium: named for the continent that had been named after Europa.

Titanium is unique in that it refers to a group of deities rather than any particular individual.  So Helios, Selene, Pallas, and Prometheus actually have two elements named in their honor.

And for elements given a name connected with a group, there is also xenon, named for the Greek word ξένον (xenon), neuter singular form of ξένος (xenos), meaning 'foreign(er)', 'strange(r)', or 'guest'.
Its discoverer William Ramsay intended this name to be an indication of the qualities of this element in analogy to the generic group of people.

Gallium was discovered by French scientist Paul-Émile Lecoq de Boisbaudran, who named it in honor of France ("Gallia" in Latin); allegations were later made that he had also named it for himself, as "gallus" is Latin for "le coq", but he denied that this had been his intention.

See also
List of scientists whose names are used as units
List of scientists whose names are used in physical constants
List of chemical elements named after places
List of chemical element name etymologies
Naming of chemical elements
List of chemical elements

References

People
History of science
People
Lists of scientists
Chemical elements

Lists of things named after people